Lugliano is a small  frazione (village) located in the municipality of Bagni di Lucca, in the Province of Lucca, Tuscany.

Geography 
Located at the edge of the 43rd parallel, at about 400 meters above sea level, the village of Lugliano dominates the Serchio valley, the valley of the Lima stream, and the two valleys of the streams Buliesima and Pizzorne. Behind it are the hills of Pizzorne, which separate it from the plain of Lucca.

The village enjoys an excellent view over the Garfagnana, featuring the appendages of the Apuan Alps, the Pania della Croce and the Pania Secca, and the Tuscan-Emilian Apennines, particularly Mount Giovo and the Rondinaio. In a northerly direction, the view sweeps along the valley that goes from Bagni di Lucca up towards Abetone following the course of the Lima stream.

Its elevated position allows it to be visible from many other villages, including San Cassiano, Benabbio and Monti di Villa, as well as villages of the municipality of Borgo a Mozzano such as Corsagna, Oneta, La Cune and La Rocca.

History 

With origins traced back to the late antiquity, it is believed that its name comes from a Roman settler, like other toponyms bearing the same suffix. Dominated by the remains of the castle still partly visible in the upper part, in medieval times it was a feud of the Suffredinghi family.

Since its inception, the village had always been part of the Duchy of Lucca, and in 1848 following the sale of the duchy, it became part of the Grand Duchy of Tuscany, which lead to it being subsequently incorporated into the Kingdom of Italy after the Italian unification.

Located in a strategic place on three hills, overlooking the confluence of the river Serchio and the Lima stream, the village was used as an outpost to keep control over the Via Francigena, now known as the SS12, which connects the city of Lucca with the province of Modena.

Situated in a dominant position with respect to the fortifications of the Gothic Line, it had military importance during the Second World War, having been occupied by German troops, who installed a series of artillery batteries that fired in a southerly direction towards the city of Lucca in the hands of allied troops. Following the breakthrough of the German lines, the village was occupied by the British, who in turn placed in batteries aimed this time at the mountains of Garfagnana. There were never any clashes between the population and the occupying troops, as both the German command and the British command maintained a good relationship with the inhabitants. The Citti, one of the most common surnames in Lugliano, in the early 1800s populated the island of Gorgona, Livorno, giving rise to the current fishing village. The Grand Duke of Tuscany sent about 200 farmers to cultivate the island, who then became fishermen, until these days. Currently, an attempt is being made to twin Lugliano with the island of Gorgona.

In the immediate post-war period, a phenomenon of emigration affected the village: northern Europe, France, Germany and the Benelux countries, as well as North America, were amongst the preferred destinations. Many young people with a low education profile were sent to work in steelworks and coal mines. Almost all emigrants have maintained a connection with their country of origin; some of them have returned during the economic boom, while others, often the second generations, have preferred not to return after the death of their parents and have sold the inherited houses.

Currently the village is almost completely inhabited.

Heraldry 

The coat of arms of the village is Janus with two ears of wheat.

Places of interest 

The village still preserves its medieval appearance, with many of the houses characterised by stone walls. In the upper part, the plans of the old castle are still evident, with the three streets that branch from the opening called "La Porta" (the door), which once served as the entrance of the fortification. The steep avenue that leads to the upper part of the village is paved in stone and in its half is placed a wrought iron cross, which gives it its name "Crociale". The three above mentioned streets lead to a small square called "La Cisterna" (the cistern), as there used to be a structure that collected rainwater for the use of the castle; the cistern was replaced by a parking lot, built in the seventies.

Lugliano has a 17th century parish church, restored years ago with the voluntary contribution of the inhabitants and dedicated to the patron saint St James. The feast in his honour takes place every year on 26 July and it is accompanied by a procession. The primitive church, built before the year 1000, was dedicated to St Martin, but in 1269 it was rededicated to St James. The structure has undergone various additions and changes over the centuries, having been expanded in 1118, and rebuilt in the fourteenth century; in 1854 the central nave was walled up, and the facade and flooring were rebuilt in 1915. Inside the church, which has three naves, are some well preserved paintings, one of these attributed to Matteo Rossetti, and two statues: the "Madonna with Child" in polychrome terracotta by Benedetto Buglioni, and a wooden statue of the patron saint, attributed to the sculptor Matteo Civitali. The church square at the entrance of the old town features two oratories, dedicated to the Holy Name of Jesus and the Nativity of Mary, located respectively on the left and right of the main building. The two oratories were in the past seats of various religious companies, but are currently being used as storage space. The church is dominated by a bell tower in crenellated stone with a clock, which has recently been restored with help by the community.

Following the road to the "ancient" town, before the steep climb of the "Crociale" is a small votive chapel built in the 17th century, restored in the 20th century and dedicated to St Anne. It houses candles of thanksgiving inside and flakes on the outside on the occasion of the birth of children.

Continuing towards the road that leads to the Pizzorne, after the cemetery, is another votive chapel dedicated to the "Holy Face", also built around the middle of the 17th century as a thanksgiving for the plague having spared the village.

In the square located in the centre of the village, lies a fountain built around 1820 by a British family. Engraved on the stone fountain are the words dictated by the English nobleman in memory of the building.

Villa Politi, formerly a private residence, but currently owned by the Barbantine nuns of Lucca, features a boxwood labyrinth. In the garden of the villa, is a centuries-old ash mentioned in an ancient writing for its ability to accommodate many people in its branches.

Frazioni of the Province of Lucca